
Year 581 (DLXXXI) was a common year starting on Wednesday (link will display the full calendar) of the Julian calendar. The denomination 581 for this year has been used since the early medieval period, when the Anno Domini calendar era became the prevalent method in Europe for naming years.

Events 
 By place 

 Byzantine Empire 
 Byzantine–Sasanian War: A Byzantine army commanded by Maurice, and supported by Ghassanid forces under King Al-Mundhir III, fails to capture the Persian capital, Ctesiphon, along the Euphrates.
 Maurice accuses Mundhir III of treason, and brings him to Constantinople to face trial. Emperor Tiberius II Constantine treats him well, and allows Mundhir with his family a comfortable residence.Shahîd 1995, p. 459–462 
 Al-Nu'man VI, son (de facto) of Mundhir III, revolts with the Ghassanids against the Byzantine Empire, after his father is treacherously arrested.

 Europe 
 Palace coup in Austrasia: New advisors break the peace treaty with King Guntram, and make a new alliance with his half brother Chilperic I, in which Childebert II, age 11, is recognized as Chilperic's heir.
 The Lombards under Zotto, Duke of Benevento, sack the abbey of Monte Cassino near Naples. The Benedictine monks who survive flee to Rome, but they return to the site, and rebuild the monastery.
 The Göktürks under Taspar Qaghan besiege the city of Chersonesos Taurica (modern Ukraine), located at the Black Sea; their cavalry keep plundering the steppes of the Crimean Peninsula until 590.

 Britain 
 The Anglo-Saxons under Ælla conquer Deira (Northern England) from the Britons. He becomes the first king of Deira (according to the Anglo-Saxon Chronicle).

 Asia 
 The  Northern Zhou Dynasty ends: Yáng Jiān executes the last ruler, 8-year-old Jing Di, along with 58 royal relatives at Chang'an. He proclaims himself emperor, and establishes the Sui Dynasty in China.
 The "Great City of Helu", situated on the shores of Taihu Lake, is renamed Suzhou during the Sui Dynasty (approximate date).
 In the Turkic Empire an interregnum begins, since there are several candidates to the throne: Talopien (late khagan's candidate), Ishbara (Kurultai's choice) and Tardu (western yabghu).
 Ishbara Qaghan, grandson of Bumin Qaghan, becomes the new ruler (khagan) of the Turkic Khaganate (Central Asia).
 The Sui dynasty begins.

 By topic 

 Literature 
 Maurice writes an encyclopedic work on the science of war (the Strategikon), which exercises a major influence on the military system.

 Religion 
 Second Council of Mâcon: In a council of Christian bishops in Mâcon (Burgundy), Jews are prohibited from serving as judges or customs officers.

Births 
 Sun Simiao, Chinese medicine doctor (approximate date)
 Yan Shigu, Chinese author of the Tang dynasty (d. 645)

Deaths 
 Feng Xiaolian, concubine of Gao Wei (approximate date)
 Jing Di, Chinese emperor of Northern Zhou (b. 573)
 Taspar Qaghan, ruler (khagan) of the Göktürks

References